Kim A-lim ( 韓語: 김아림,  born 4 October 1995) is a South Korean professional golfer who currently plays on the LPGA of Korea Tour.

Kim turned professional as a teenager in 2013 and began playing on the KLPGA in 2016. She has two wins on the tour, the first coming at the Pak Se-ri Invitational in October 2018. She also won the MY Munyoung Queens Park Championship in 2019 and finished 11th on the KLPGA money list that season.

In December 2020, Kim made her LPGA major championship debut in the 2020 U.S. Women's Open at Champions Golf Club in Houston, Texas. Entering the final round five shots off the lead, she birdied the last three holes to shoot 67 and won the tournament by one shot over Ko Jin-young and Amy Olson.

Professional wins (4)

LPGA Tour wins (1)

LPGA of Korea Tour wins (3)
2018 (1) OK! Savings Bank Pak Se-ri Invitational
2019 (1) MY Munyoung Queens Park Championship
2022 (1) Creas F&C KLPGA Championship

Major championships

Wins (1)

Results timeline

CUT = missed the half-way cut
NT = no tournament
T = tied

References

External links
LPGA Tour of Korea profile 

South Korean female golfers
LPGA of Korea Tour golfers
Winners of LPGA major golf championships
1995 births
Living people